The International Development Law Organization (IDLO) is an intergovernmental organization dedicated to the promotion of the rule of law.

With a joint focus on the promotion of rule of law and development, it works to empower people and communities to claim their rights, and provides governments with the know-how to realize them. It supports emerging economies and middle-income countries to strengthen their legal capacity and rule of law framework for sustainable development and economic opportunity. It is the only intergovernmental organization with an exclusive mandate to promote the rule of law and has experience working in dozens of countries around the world.

IDLO is headquartered in Rome, Italy and has a branch office in The Hague and is one of a number of entities that are United Nations General Assembly observers.

IDLO has operated in dozens of sovereign states, focusing on institution-building and legal empowerment. Its alumni network includes more than 20,000 legal professionals in 175 countries and 46 independent alumni associations. 
 
IDLO has signed MoUs with United Nations agencies, governments, universities, and other entities. Major financial contributions to IDLO have come from the Australian Agency for International Development, Gates Foundation, Center for International Forestry Research, European Bank for Reconstruction and Development, European Union, Ford Foundation, Deutsche Gesellschaft für Internationale Zusammenarbeit, International Fund for Agricultural Development, Institute of Medicine, Kuwait Fund for Arab Economic Development, OPEC Fund for International Development, United Nations Development Programme, and UNICEF as well as numerous countries, namely Canada, China, Denmark, France, Ireland, Italy, Netherlands, Sweden, Switzerland, United Kingdom, and the United States.

Jan Beagle is the current Director-General of IDLO.

History
IDLO began in 1983 as a non-governmental organization (then called International Development Law Institute) founded by three legal advisors to cooperation agencies in Egypt: L. Michael Hager (USA), William T. Loris (USA) and Gilles Blanchi (France), with a Board presided by Dr Ibrahim Shihata (Founder of the OPEC Fund for international Development and Senior Vice-president and General Counsel of the World Bank from 1983 to 1998). The Board also included, among others, Professor René David. The Governments of the United States and Italy provided the start-up seed money and the Headquarter establishment agreement was signed in Rome in 1988. The Institute changed to an intergovernmental organization in 1991 after its first Assembly of Member States in 1990.  After the Fall of the Berlin Wall, increased training and assistance was provided in the field of legal and judicial reform in developing and transition countries. In the second half of the 90s, greater attention was also given to sustainable development and the civil society as well as to countries emerging from conflicts if not genocides (e.g. Cambodia, Rwanda).  In 2002, the institute was renamed International Development Law Organisation. In 2001 IDLO was granted Permanent Observer Status at the United Nations. In 2014, IDLO opened a branch office in The Hague.

Governance

Member States
As an inter-governmental organization, membership to the organization is made up of signatories to the Establishment Agreement of IDLO. The thirty-seven Parties to IDLO's Establishment Agreement are:

 Afghanistan
 Australia
 Austria
 Bulgaria
 Burkina Faso
 China
 Ecuador [Member of Standing Committee]
 Egypt
 El Salvador
 France
 Honduras
 Italy [Vice President ex officio] [Chair of Audit and Finance Committee]
 Jordan
 Kenya
 Kuwait [Member of Standing Committee and Audit and Finance Committee]
 Liberia
 Mali
 Mongolia
 Montenegro
 Mozambique [Vice President]
 Netherlands
 Norway
 OFID
 Pakistan [Member of Audit and Finance Committee]
 Paraguay
 Peru [Member of Audit and Finance Committee]
 Philippines [Member of Standing Committee]
 Qatar 
 Romania 
 Senegal [Member of Audit and Finance Committee]
 Sudan
 Sweden
 Tunisia
 Turkey [Member of Standing Committee and Audit and Finance Committee]
 Uganda
 USA [President] [Member of Audit and Finance Committee]
 Vietnam

Governance Structure

Assembly of Parties
Member Party states form the Assembly of Parties, IDLO's highest decision-making body. Kuwait currently sits as President of the Assembly of parties while the US has won the vice-president post. The role of the Assembly is to determine the IDLO's policies and oversee the work of the Director-General.

Director-General
Jan Beagle is the current Director-General. She was elected by Member Parties on 13 November 2019 and took up her position formally on 1 January 2020 for a term of four years.

International Advisory Council

IDLO's International Advisory Council is composed of:

 Abdel-Latif Al-Hamad: Chairman and CEO, Arab Fund for Economic and Social Development
 Abdou Diouf: Former President of the Republic of Senegal
 Willy Mutunga: Former Chief Justice of Kenya
 Thomas Pickering: Former United States Ambassador and Under Secretary of State
 Mary Robinson: Former UN High Commissioner for Human Rights
 Albie Sachs: Former Justice, Constitutional Court of South Africa
 Muhammad Yunus: Nobel Peace Laureate, Chairman of Yunus Centre and Founder of Grameen Bank

Senior Management 
 Karen Johnson: General Counsel
 Franco Sanchez-Hidalgo: Director of Programmes
 Haroun Atallah: Director of Finance and Support Services
 Ilaria Bottigliero: Director of Policy, Research and Learning
 Mark Cassayre: Permanent Observer to the United Nations (Geneva)
 Henk-Jan Brinkman: Permanent Observer to the United Nations (New York)
 Raul Cordenillo: Director of Strategic Communications
 Usama Bastawy: Interim Director of Human Resources and Office Support Services

Work

IDLO has worked in dozens of countries around the world, working with the belief that justice means ensuring fair outcomes in concrete, local terms.

Somalia
IDLO has been working in Somalia for the last thirty years, providing training to Somali legal professionals and technical assistance to the judiciary. Somali Prime Minister, Dr. Abdiweli Mohamed Ali has called IDLO "a premiere institution that is supporting Somalia on its journey to peace and stability."

In recent years, IDLO has worked on supporting the development of a Somali constitution and in the integration of customary justice. In 2011 IDLO created an assessment of traditional and customary justice, arguing that linking customary and traditional justice in a bottom up approach would be most effective.

Financed by the Italian government, IDLO worked with local experts on the country's provisional Constitution, holding consultative sessions with Mogadishu residents, refugees, and the Somali diaspora.

Towards the adoption of the Constitution, IDLO helped produce a comparative analysis of the new draft Constitution, the Constitution of 1960 and the Transitional Federal Charter of 2004 and supported the Constitutional Affairs and Reconciliation Ministry in hosting a conference on fundamental rights and transitional justice.

Following the adoption of the constitution by the National Constitution Assembly on 1 August 2012 IDLO drafted a report on providing analysis and suggestions for Justice and Security development under the new constitutional order. The report provides a description of steps to be taken during the implementation phase of the constitution, including the establishment of institutions, development and revision of legislative frameworks, and capacity building. It also sketches out dispute resolution mechanisms of the three legal systems in Somalia: xeer, Shari’ah, and the statutory judiciary.

Comparing the draft constitution to those from 53 of the 56 member states of the Organization of the Islamic Cooperation, as well as the constitutions of Italy and the United States of America, IDLO found that it contained 36 of the 45 fundamental rights - placing it in the top five of the countries surveyed. The organization also stated that the Somali draft constitution contained 15 more than the Constitution of the United States of America.

Afghanistan
IDLO has been active in Afghanistan since 2002, stating their intent has been to restore rule of law in the country and develop a new idea of justice, while respecting the principles of Islam. Primarily Afghan staff have been used to train legal professionals in the country.

Following a survey taken by the IDLO in 2013 which found that women made up just over 8 percent of the country's judges, 6 percent of prosecutors and less than one fifth of lawyers, IDLO's Director General Irene Khan called for greater participation of women in the Afghanistan's justice sector.

Women's Rights

Whilst the Constitution of Afghanistan offers protection to women, domestic and sexual violence are common and considered a family matter, dealt through informal justice systems composed of male elders. In June 2009, IDLO launched Afghanistan's first Violence against Women Unit, with support from the office of the Attorney General of Afghanistan.  IDLO reports that in 2010 the unit handled more than 300 cases.

In December 2010 The U.S. Department of State's Bureau of International Narcotics and Law Enforcement Affairs (INL) contributed $12.1 million to expand and improve legal aid services to the poor and disempowered, increase public awareness of legal issues, rights and services, and improve the investigation and prosecution of crimes against women and girls.

On 11 April 2013 INL announced it would provide IDLO a further $59 million for programmes in Afghanistan: $47 million to fund IDLO implement training programmes for the Afghan justice sector – the Justice Training Transition Program (JTTP) – and another $12 million for a separate IDLO program to provide support and training for prosecution of crimes against women.

Allegations of Lack of Oversight
In January 2014 the Special Inspector General for Afghanistan Reconstruction (SIGAR) released a report highlighting it believed there to be a lack of oversight requirements in INL's 2013 contract with IDLO in relation to JTTP . SIGAR had previously warned of a lack of monitoring in an ‘alert-letter’ to the State Department sent to the State Department on July 22, 2013. The letter also accused IDLO of refusing to provide SIGAR with information regarding its budget, organizational structure and financial relationship with the US government.

In response to SIGAR's 2013 statement, State Department deputy spokeswoman Marie Harf said that there were no allegations or evidence of fraud, waste or mismanagement in the program and that oversight was provided through daily contact on the ground. In a letter responding to SIGAR's claims, INL highlighted mechanisms of accountability and stated their confidence in the IDLO program.

In a statement posted on their website IDLO called their monitoring and evaluation mechanisms ‘robust and extensive’.  IDLO also refuted SIGAR's statement that it had refused to provide information writing that they had met with SIGAR staff in April and May 2013.

South Sudan
IDLO provided the newly established country of South Sudan with technical legal assistance; training the judiciary in both the fundamentals of common law and, during the process of transition away from a Shari’ah based legal system, in ‘legal’ English.

With funding from the European Union in 2014, IDLO scaled up their work in South Sudan, delivering a series of context-specific training courses to 150 newly appointed judges and judicial support staff.

IDLO also stated it was providing technical assistance in drafting a permanent Constitution for South Sudan.

Kenya
Working with constitutional scholars Zachary Elkins and Tom Ginsberg, IDLO sponsored a group of constitutional scholars from universities in America to review drafts of the Kenyan constitution and provide feedback to the Kenyan Parliament.

In 2013, USAID partnered with IDLO to assist the Government of Kenya develop the comprehensive laws and policies required under the new Constitution, assisting the Kenyan Parliament in reviewing, analysing and passing 55 laws, including 16 required by the Constitution. Investigators in the project used data and analyzed from over 3000 constitutions in the world to share with Kenya's Commission for the Implementation of the Constitution (CIC) an analysis of the constitutional implementation process. IDLO also implemented projects to strengthen the capacity of the judiciary and engage the public in the process. IDLO has also stated that they are working with the government of Kenya to advance gender equality across the country and enact gender provisions contained in the Constitution.

An independent report found that its work in Kenya had provided support and services were delivered to fulfil identified needs COE and ensured the delivery trainings to educate Kenyans on the proposed Constitution before it was put to a national referendum. Despite some challenges, the report notes, IDLO consultants produced and delivered high quality technical reports and services which eventually contributed to the final version of the Constitution of Kenya.

A permanent IDLO regional office was set up in Kenya in 2011.

Women and Girls

In a speech at the Graduate Institute of International and Development Studies in Geneva, Director-General Irene Khan highlighted the importance of law in empowering women:

"A core principle of the rule of law is that we are all equal - equally protected by the law and equally accountable to it."

The organization's website states that across all of its programs, IDLO works to empower women. In February 2013 IDLO released a report on women's access to justice, with a focus on improving customary justice for women.

Customary Justice
IDLO has a number of times, including at the UN, emphasized the importance of working with informal or customary justice systems and has released three edited volumes on customary justice.

Controversies 

The US government's Office of Special Inspector General for Afghanistan Reconstruction (SIGAR) investigated IDLO's program in Afghanistan titled 'Justice Training Transition Program' (JTTP) funded with $47.8 million of US taxpayer's money. The investigation was conducted by SIGAR at the request of Senator Claire McCaskill who has maintained a long-standing position that she "ha[s] serious concerns about the effectiveness of the [Justice Sector Support Program] (that was transitioned to IDLO under the name 'JTTP' but without any changes in substance)".[50] JTTP was funded by the Bureau of International Narcotics and Law Enforcement Affairs (INL) of the United States Department of State. It was and remains to-day the State Department's largest justice program in the world. On July 22, 2013, SIGAR issued an alert letter to Secretary of State John Kerry alerting Secretary Kerry to the following: (1) JTTP was granted to IDLO as a sole source award (absent any competitive process); (2) there were very few oversight provisions in the State Department's contract with IDLO; (3) State Department told SIGAR that "they d[id] not have the authority to demand basic organizational and project information from IDLO because it is an international organization;" (4) State Department violated its own contracting policy when it issued the JTTP contract to IDLO; (5) SIGAR found that "IDLO is ill-prepared to manage and account for how U.S.-taxpayer funds will be spent on the JTTP; (6) in the years leading up to JTTP IDLO's funding had decreased; (7) IDLO lacks proper international financial certifications; and (8) IDLO refused to fully comply with SIGAR's repeated requests for information. SIGAR concluded that "it was ill-considered for [the State Department] to have awarded almost $50 million to an organization that may not have the ability to account for the use of those funds, under an agreement in which [the State Department] failed to require proper provisions for oversight".[51] SIGAR stated that in light of IDLO's refusal to provide information "it may [...] be necessary to subpoena IDLO to compel the production of any and all records IDLO possesses related to its operations in Afghanistan".[51] IDLO responded by calling the SIGAR assessment contained in the alert letter of July 22, 2013 "incorrect".[52] State Department sought to defend its position by justifying his sole-source award to IDLO by stating that "they are the best positioned to do this work, period, as they are the only not-for-profit intergovernmental organization that is exclusively dedicated to working with governments to promote the rule of law",[53] without elaborating on this assertion in any manner that could reasonably allay SIGAR's substantive and detailed concerns. In January 2014, SIGAR issued a full report entitled 'Support for Afghanistan's Justice Sector: State Department Programs Need Better Management and Stronger Oversight'.[54] In that report SIGAR found the following in relation to IDLO: (1) JTTP was transferred to IDLO despite the management and financial challenges IDLO was facing at the time; (2) IDLO's high leadership turnover and budgetary shortfalls, by IDLO's own admission, raised serious questions about the future sustainability of the organization; (3) State Department has limited authority to oversee IDLO's work; and (4) State failed to secure contractual provisions to oversee IDLO. Despite this report JTTP was allowed to proceed without changes.

SIGAR launched a fresh investigation into IDLO in December, 2015. In 2016, the US Department of Justice launched an investigation of certain individuals associated with IDLO's Justice Training Transition Program.

Describing the early days of IDLO in Afghanistan, some have summed up its key achievements as follows: (1) "rent[ing]" one of the largest NGO offices in Kabul;" and (2) "creati[ng] a digital compilation of Afghan laws that it declined to share" (Deena Hurwitz et al., Human Rights Stories). A former Interior Minister of Afghanistan describes Italy's efforts, that were largely conducted through IDLO, in the following manner: "Italian-sponsored justice sector reform suffers from a very low level of human resources and infrastructure capacity" (id).

References

External links
 idlo.int

Intergovernmental organizations
Organizations established in 1983
International organisations based in Italy
International law organizations
International development agencies
Oversight and watchdog organizations